The Battle of Maloyaroslavets took place on 24 October 1812  as part of the French invasion of Russia. It was Kutuzov's decisive battle to force Napoleon to retreat northwest over Mozhaisk to Smolensk on the devastated route of his advance with a higher probability of starvation. Kutuzov's next attack against the remnants of the Grande Armee, the Battle of Krasnoi, began on 15 November 1812, 3 weeks later.

Prelude
The last major battle had been the Battle of Tarutino on 18 October 1812, that was won by the Russian army.
A great part of the large mob of non-combatants, invalids from the hospitals, women, fugitive inhabitants of Moscow, whose number can only be guessed at, was directed upon Vereia and the straight road to Smolensk and only the fighting force was to march towards Kaluga.
On 19 October 1812, Napoleon had retreated from Moscow and marched south-west to Kaluga, Eugene de Beauharnais leading the advance
The French army leaving Moscow was estimated by Wilson: 90,000 effective infantry, 14,000 feeble cavalry, 12,000 armed men employed in the various services of artillery, engineers, gendarmerie, head-quarter staff, equipages, and commissariat, and more than 20,000 non-combatants, sick, and wounded.

Alexis Joseph Delzons commanded the lead units going to the village of Maloyaroslavets. The bridges across Luzha River were destroyed by order of local authorities. Delzons' soldiers entered the city over a dam and built a pontoon bridge next to the destroyed one. Then Delzons attacked the heights on which the village rested. On the evening of October 23 Delzons placed two of his battalions in the village.

Battle
On the 24 October 1812 General Dokhturov entered the town from the south and found the French spearhead had seized a bridgehead. Fierce fighting began. General Raevski arrived with 10,000 more Russians; once more they took the town, though not the bridgehead. De Beauharnais threw in his 15th (Italian) division, under Domenico Pino (Minister of War of the Kingdom of Italy), and by evening they had again expelled the Russians. Armand Charles Guilleminot was the first who entered the city. During the course of the engagement the town changed hands no fewer than eight times and it was quoted that in particular the Italian Royal Guard under Eugène de Beauharnais 'had displayed qualities which entitled it evermore to take rank amongst the bravest troops of Europe'. Marshal Kutuzov arrived and decided against a pitched battle with the Grand Army the next day, and to retire instead to the prepared line of defense at Kaluga. The mainly French and Italian forces won a victory on the day, but Napoleon might have realized that "unless with a new Borodino" the way through Kaluga and Medyn was closed. This allowed Kutuzov to fulfill his strategic plans to force Napoleon on the way of retreat in the north, through Mozhaisk and Smolensk, the route of his advance that he had wished to avoid. French casualties were about 6,000–8,000, while the Russians lost about 8,000 men killed and wounded.

Kutuzov's strategy
On the 25 October 1812 at about two in the morning after the battle Kutuzov retired his army in perfect order southwards away from the French army behind the rivulet of Koricza to secure the road to Kaluga. The British general Wilson who wanted Napoleon to be attacked protested against this strategy. Kutuzov replied to him, here simplified for a better understanding: "I am by no means sure that the total destruction of the Emperor Napoleon and his army would be such a benefit to Russia; his succession would fall to the United Kingdom whose domination would then be intolerable."

Aftermath

The immediate result of the battle of Maloyaroslavets on the 24th had been a strange French tactical victory: the French army had secured a bridgehead, the Russian army had retreated but Napoleon did not follow them. The long-term result of the battle became a Russian strategic victory  as they had disturbed Napoleon's ability to wage a war.

On the 25th, at daybreak, Napoleon nearly was caught by a Cossack regiment but was saved by a corps of grenadiers.

Since the 25th Napoleon carried a bag containing a lethal poison using a string around his neck.

On the 26th, Napoleon decided to retreat over Mozhaisk and Borodino to Smolensk for reasons unknown resulting in the strange detour in the attached map of Napoleon's invasion of Russia at Maloyaroslavets.
On the 26th Napoleon again set out for Maloyaroslavets,...he ordered the retreat of his own army by Mozhaisk on Smolensk.
Before Napoleon could come to such a conclusion he must have been very conscious of the extreme weakness of his army, for the march he now decided on undertaking was one of two hundred and sixty miles through a devastated country, whose towns, sacked and burnt, offered no shelter or supply against the inclemency of winter.

On the night of October 27, the rear guard of the Grand Army left the ruins of the city, crossed to the northern bank of the Luzha and joined the general retreat.

On Kutuzov's order, Platow and his Cossacks directly followed Napoleon. The next major battle for the Russian army was the Battle of Vyazma on 3 November 1812.

Kutuzov "escorted" Napoleon on the more southern roads with better supply of food and shelter, securing the south against the French army. The next battle for Kutuzov was the Battle of Krasnoi on 15 November 1812.

The last battle in this campaign for Napoleon was the Battle of Berezina on 26–29 November 1812.

See also
List of battles of the French invasion of Russia

Notes

References

Sources
  Bourgogne, Adrien Jean Baptiste François, Memoirs of Sergeant Bourgogne, 1812–1813
 Chambray, George de, Histoire de l'expédition de Russie
 Weider, Ben and Franceschi, The Wars Against Napoleon: Debunking the Myth of the Napoleonic Wars, 2007
 Zamoyski, Adam, Moscow 1812, Napoleon's Fatal March, 1980

External links
 

Battles of the French invasion of Russia
Battles of the Napoleonic Wars
Battles inscribed on the Arc de Triomphe
Battles involving France
Battles involving Russia
Battles involving the Kingdom of Italy (Napoleonic)
Conflicts in 1812
1812 in the Russian Empire
October 1812 events